Dudley North is a constituency represented in the House of Commons of the UK Parliament since 2019 by Marco Longhi, of the Conservative Party.

Campaigns in the seat have resulted in a minimum of 30% of votes at each election consistently for the same two parties' choice for candidate, and the next highest-placed share having fluctuated between 5.5% and 24% of the vote since its creation: for differing parties, the highest placed of these having been the UK Independence Party. The seat attracted seven candidates in 1997 and 2015 and four in 2001.

Members of Parliament

Boundaries 

Dudley North is one of four constituencies presently covering the Metropolitan Borough of Dudley, encompassing the northern part of the borough, including the town centre.

2010–present: The Metropolitan Borough of Dudley wards of Castle and Priory, Gornal, St James's, St Thomas's, Sedgley, and Upper Gornal and Woodsetton.

1997–2010: The Metropolitan Borough of Dudley wards of Castle and Priory, Coseley East, Coseley West, Gornal, St James's, St Thomas's, and Sedgley.

History
Before the 1997 election, Dudley was divided into East and West constituencies, rather than the current North and Dudley South. Dudley North covers much of the area previously covered by Dudley East, which included Netherton but excluded the western part of Sedgley, which was part of Dudley West.

The earlier Dudley constituency, consisting of central Dudley, Netherton, and Stourbridge, was more prominent before 1974. Colonel George Wigg (later Lord Wigg), Prime Minister Harold Wilson's adviser on security matters and later a Minister of State, held the seat for many years until elevated to the peerage in 1968.  At the Dudley by-election in March of that year, Donald Williams, the Conservative candidate, gained the seat with a swing of 20%. In 1970, however, the seat was regained by Labour with the election of Dr John Gilbert, who subsequently represented Dudley East from February 1974 until its abolition at the 1997 general election. Gilbert served as a Minister of State under both James Callaghan and (as a peer) Tony Blair. Dudley West meanwhile was represented, until his death in 1994, by Conservative MP Dr John Blackburn. At the subsequent Dudley West by election the seat was a Labour gain with Ian Pearson elected. After boundary changes, Pearson became the MP for the newly created Dudley South seat at the 1997 election

Ross Cranston (Labour) was the first MP for the new Dudley North seat after winning it at the 1997 election; he remained the constituencies MP until the 2005 general election, when it was retained by his successor Ian Austin.

In 2010, Austin held onto his seat with 38.7% of the vote, a narrow 1.7% ahead of Conservative candidate Graeme Brown, at the first general election in 36 years which resulted in a hung parliament. Despite increasing his majority to 11% at the 2015 election (4,181 votes), in 2017 – after two recounts – it was reduced to a mere 22 votes, the fourth smallest majority at that election, and was the Labour seat that was closest to being taken by the Conservatives that election. (Walsall North, a closely neighbouring constituency was indeed gained by the Conservatives.) In 2019, the Conservatives gained the seat for the first time, with their candidate Marco Longhi winning a majority of more than 11,000 votes. The Conservative vote share increased by 16.6% in the seat, which was the party's fifth-largest increase at the election.

Elections

Elections in the 2010s

The original Conservative candidate for the 2015 election Afzal Amin was suspended after allegations he persuaded the English Defence League to announce a march against a mosque in the constituency

Elections in the 2000s

Elections in the 1990s

See also 
 List of parliamentary constituencies in the West Midlands (county)
 List of parliamentary constituencies in Dudley

Notes

References

Politics of Dudley
Parliamentary constituencies in the West Midlands (county)
Constituencies of the Parliament of the United Kingdom established in 1997
1997 establishments in England